Umar Magometovich Markhiyev (born 12 January 1969) is a Russian professional football coach and a former player.

Club career
He made his Russian Football National League debut for FC Erzu Grozny on 3 April 1993 in a game against FC Druzhba Maykop. He played 5 seasons in the FNL for Erzu and FC Uralan Elista.

External links
 

1969 births
Sportspeople from Grozny
Living people
Russian footballers
Association football defenders
FC Elista players
FC Angusht Nazran players
Russian football managers
Russian expatriate football managers
Expatriate football managers in Finland
Expatriate football managers in Armenia
Chechen people
Russian Muslims